Events from the year 1984 in France.

Incumbents
 President: François Mitterrand 
 Prime Minister: Pierre Mauroy (until 17 July), Laurent Fabius (starting 17 July)

Events
 21 April – The Renault Espace, Europe's first production people carrier, is launched.
 October – Launch of the new "Supercinque" Renault 5, a new version of the hugely popular supermini which debuted 12 years ago and has been a huge sales success for the French carmaker.
 27 June – The France national football team wins a major tournament for the first time, beating Spain 2-0 as the host nation in the Parc des Princes.
 13 July – Opening of the Musée de la Révolution française.
 16 October – the Murder of Grégory Villemin
 4 November – Canal+, a satellite and cable multi channels television station, a first regular broadcasting service to start.

Sport
12 June – UEFA European Championship begins in France.
27 June – UEFA Euro 1984 ends, won by France.
29 June – Tour de France begins.
22 July – Tour de France ends, won by Laurent Fignon.

Births

January to March
5 January – Laurent Mohellebi, soccer player.
6 January – Serisay Barthelemy, soccer player.
9 January – Kalifa Cissé, soccer player.
10 January – Sigamary Diarra, soccer player.
10 January – Sébastien Le Toux, soccer player.
19 January – Aurélien Passeron, cyclist.
23 January – Stéphane Besle, soccer player.
27 January – Stéphen Drouin, soccer player.
4 February – Souleimane Konate, kickboxer and martial artist.
6 February – Benjamin Thiéry, rugby union player.
8 February – Jérôme Cellier, soccer player.
14 February – Rémi Gomis, soccer player.
19 February – David Fleurival, soccer player.
25 February – Jacques Faty, soccer player.
1 March – Robin Desserne, soccer player.
2 March – David Leray, soccer player.
4 March – Nicolas Raynier, soccer player.
7 March – Cédric Collet, soccer player.
7 March – Mathieu Flamini, soccer player.
15 March – Badradine Belloumou, soccer player.
16 March – Laurent Agouazi, soccer player.
21 March – Grégory Mallet, swimmer.
22 March – Stéphane Darbion, soccer player.
22 March – Kévin Jacmot, soccer player.
24 March – Benoît Assou-Ekotto, soccer player.

April to June
2 April – Nicolas Lapierre, motor racing driver.
2 April – Jérémy Morel, soccer player.
10 April – Damien Perquis, soccer player.
11 April – Sébastien Turgot, cyclist.
16 April – Romain Feillu, cyclist.
24 April – Sekou Baradji, soccer player.
24 April – Jérémy Berthod, soccer player.
27 April – Fabien Gilot, swimmer.
30 April – Jean Calvé, soccer player.
1 May – Therry Racon, soccer player.
2 May – Yann Huguet, cyclist.
2 May – Pierre Piskor, soccer player.
17 May – Vincent Durand, soccer player.
18 May – Simon Pagenaud, motor racing driver.
29 May 
 Gauthier Grumier, épée fencer.
 Alysson Paradis, actress  
3 June – Jean-Jacques Mandrichi, soccer player.
13 June – Bérangère Schuh, archer.
23 June – Sébastien Grax, soccer player.

July to September
1 July – Grégory Bourillon, soccer player
3 July – Nicolas Roche, cyclist
8 July – Youssef Sofiane, soccer player
10 July – Michaël Chrétien Basser, soccer player
10 July – Laurent Recouderc, tennis player
11 July – Sébastien Renouard, soccer player
13 July – Jimmy Abdou, soccer player
23 July – Yann Jouffre, soccer player
25 July – Jean Eudes Demaret, cyclist
6 August – Sofia Essaïdi, singer
13 August – Youssouf Kanté, soccer player
16 August – Hadrien Feraud, jazz-fusion bassist
21 August – Alizée, singer
21 August – Luigi Glombard, soccer player
26 August – Jérémy Clément, soccer player
9 September – Renaud Cohade, soccer player
9 September – Vincent Laban, soccer player
17 September – Laurent Merlin, soccer player
17 September – Elsa N'Guessan, freestyle swimmer
18 September – Christian Nadé, soccer player
18 September – Mathieu Perget, cyclist
20 September – Brian Joubert, figure skater
28 September – Mathieu Valbuena, soccer player

October to December
2 October – Marion Bartoli, tennis player.
3 October – Anthony Le Tallec, soccer player.
6 October – Arnaud Gérard, cyclist.
10 October 
 Jean-Baptiste Grange, alpine skier.
 Cherie, singer.
13 October – Nicolas Fauvergue, soccer player.
16 October – François Pervis, cyclist.
26 October – Mathieu Crépel, snowboarder.
10 November – Thierry Hupond, cyclist.
25 November – Gaspard Ulliel, actor (died 2022).
26 November – Vincent Jérôme, cyclist.
7 December – Céline Laporte, athlete.
12 December – Mathieu Ladagnous, cyclist.
12 December – Jérémy Perbet, soccer player.

Deaths

January to June
7 January – Alfred Kastler, physicist, Nobel Prize laureate (born 1902).
21 January – Roger Blin, comedian and actor (born 1907).
8 February – Philippe Ariès, medievalist and historian (born 1914).
11 February – Arlette Marchal, actress (born 1902).
5 March – Pierre Cochereau, organist and composer (born 1924).
5 March – Gérard Lebovici, film producer, editor and impresario (born 1932).
7 March – Charles Pisot, mathematician (born 1910).
13 March – François Le Lionnais, chemical engineer and mathematician (born 1901).
23 March – Jean Prouvé, architect and designer (born 1901).
18 April – Pierre Frank, Trotskyist leader (born 1905).
25 April – Jean Borthayre, operatic baritone (born 1901).
12 June – François Ducaud-Bourget, priest (born 1897).
25 June – Michel Foucault, philosopher, historian, critic and sociologist (born 1926).
30 June – Henri Fabre, aviator and aircraft designer (born 1882).

July to December
8 July – Brassaï, photographer, sculptor and filmmaker (born 1899).
31 July – Paul Le Flem, composer and musician (born 1881).
11 August – Marcel Balsa, motor racing driver (born 1901).
12 September – Yvon Petra, tennis player (born 1916)
1 October – Hellé Nice, model, dancer and motor racing driver (born 1900).
16 October – Grégory Villemin, murdered infant (born in 1980)
21 October – François Truffaut, screenwriter, film director, producer and actor (born 1932).
25 October – Pascale Ogier, actress (born 1958).
29 October – Jacques Adnet, designer, architect and interior designer (born 1900).
31 October – Denise Vernac, actress (born 1916).
1 November – Marcel Moyse, flautist (born 1889).
7 November – Marcel Barbu, politician (born 1907).
27 November – Luc Etienne (Périn), writer (born 1908).

See also
 List of French films of 1984

References

1980s in France